Samson Kasumba is a Ugandan pastor, news anchor and show host. He works with NBS Television especially live at 9.

Early life and education
He studied at Kireka SDA Primary School before being transferred and completing his primary education from Nakasero Primary School a top public primary school at the time. He moved to Kyambogo College School for his Uganda Certificate of Education then went on to Kololo High School for his Uganda Advanced Certificate of Education. He later enrolled for a diploma in commercial industrial art and design at Nkumba University. He would later return to the same university for his degree. Shortly before completing that degree, he abandoned commercial industrial art to pursue a bachelor's degree in theology at Bugema University intending to go quench a lifelong quest to understand God, his denomination as well as pursue divine calling pastoring congregations. However, while at Bugema the DVC academics at the university would identity his abilities and keen interest in Biblical languages (Greek and Hebrew) forcing him to change his course from pastoring churches, opening him to a new path in academia. This is how he was linked to an African Students' Scholarship fund to pursue a master's degree at University of Wales Lampeter. His supervisor for the master's degree thesis would then press him to continue into a PhD only to be thwarted by finances. He was forced to return to the country to lecture theology at Bugema University. Kasumba was later stopped after he was defrocked due to his views that were divergent from those of his Seventh Day Adventist faith.

Work journey 
He began work in 1996 straight out of university to join Selected Reminiscences of President Yoweri Museveni a quarterly Magazine. Moved into private business operating along both Nasser Road and Johnson Street. Worked briefly, and concurrently at both Jeremy Car Wash as manager and Monitor FM as its Gospel Show host. He worked as a lecturer at Bugema University and also volunteered at Interreligious Council of Uganda before returning to the same organization as its head of communications. He was working with Urban TV Uganda before he joined NBS Television in 2016. He was also part of Topowa Campaign by CCEDU, a human Rights advocate team sensitizing people during the 2016 general elections. He was of recent arrested for allegedly undermining government put measures to curb the spread of COVID-19.

References

1974 births
Living people
Ugandan journalists